The Whale River is a river in northeastern Quebec, Canada. It flows from Lake Manereuille northwest into Ungava Bay. Its major tributaries are the Wheeler and the Savalette.

See also 
List of rivers of Quebec
Hudson Bay drainage basin

References 

 .

Tributaries of Hudson Bay
Rivers of Nord-du-Québec
Whales and humans